This is a list of French television related events from 1962.

Events
18 March - France wins the 7th Eurovision Song Contest in Luxembourg, Luxembourg. The winning song is "Un premier amour" performed by Isabelle Aubret.

Debuts
December 10 - Bonne nuit les petits

Television shows

1940s
Le Jour du Seigneur (1949–present)

1950s
Cinq colonnes à la une
Discorama
Magazine féminin (1952-1970)
Lectures pour tous (1953-1968)
La Piste aux étoiles (1956-1978)

1960s
Chambre noire 
La Tête et les Jambes (1960-1978)
Les Coulisses de l'exploit (1961-1972)
  Télé-Philatélie
Voyage sans passeport (1957-1969)

Ending this year

Faire face February 10 1962

Births
30 November - Gérard Vivès, actor, humorist & TV presenter

See also
1962 in France
List of French films of 1962

Deaths